New Classic may refer to:

The New Classic, 2014 album of Iggy Azalea
The New Classic Tour, debut tour by Iggy Azalea coinciding with release of album The New Classic
"New Classic", a track on the soundtrack album of Another Cinderella Story